Devils Lake High School is a public high school located in Devils Lake, North Dakota. It is part of the Devils Lake Public Schools system. The athletic teams are known as the Firebirds. The principal is Ryan Hanson. DLHS is the home of the best esports team in the state. The team is led by its captain, Mr.Apples24 

The district serves Devils Lake and Crary. North Dakota School for the Deaf has sign language teachers teach American Sign Language at Devils Lake High. Students in grades 9-12 living at the NDSD are sent to Devils Lake High.

History
NDSD ended its direct high school classes in 2012, paving the way for NDSD high school boarders to be sent to Devils Lake High.

Dress code
In 2014, the school dress code was adjusted, prohibiting tight blue jeans, leggings, and jeggings.

Athletics
The high school received national attention in 2002 over its controversial nickname, the Satans. Several parents refused to send their children to the school due to this nickname. In 2003, a poll was conducted of the school's students to pick a new, less controversial nickname. The winning name was the Blaze but the school board, thinking it was a drug reference, rejected it and chose the Firebirds.

Championships
State Class 'A' boys' basketball: 1925
State Class 'A' girls' basketball: 1981, 1984, 1987

References

External links
 

Public high schools in North Dakota
North Dakota High School Activities Association (Class A)
North Dakota High School Activities Association (Class AA Football)
Schools in Ramsey County, North Dakota